Matsutoya (written: 松任谷) is a Japanese surname. Notable people with the surname include:

, Japanese musician, composer and singer-songwriter
, Japanese singer-songwriter and composer

Japanese-language surnames